Peplonia is a group of plants in the family Apocynaceae first described as a genus in 1844. The entire genus is endemic to Brazil.

Species
 Peplonia asteria (Vell.) Fontella & E.A. Schwarz - Brazil
 Peplonia axillaris (Vell.) Fontella & Rapini - Brazil
 Peplonia bradeana (Fontella & E.A. Schwarz) Fontella & Rapini - Espírito Santo
 Peplonia hatschbachii (Fontella & de Lamare) Fontella & Rapini - Paraná 
 Peplonia hilariana E.Fourn. - Brazil
 Peplonia nitida Decne. - Brazil
 Peplonia organensis (E.Fourn.) Fontella & Rapini - Brazil
 Peplonia riedelii (E.Fourn.) Fontella & Rapini - Rio de Janeiro

formerly included
moved to Blepharodon 
Peplonia amazonica Benth., synonym of Blepharodon amazonicum (Benth.) Fontella & Marquete

References

Endemic flora of Brazil
Apocynaceae genera
Asclepiadoideae
Taxa named by Joseph Decaisne